The Central American Civil War may refer to one of the following conflicts:

First Central American Civil War (1826–1829)
Second Central American Civil War (1838–1841)

Other civil wars 

Ochomogo War (1823)
League War (1835)
Nicaraguan Civil War (1926–1927)
La Matanza (1932)
Costa Rican Civil War (1948)
Guatemalan Civil War (1960–1996)
Nicaraguan Revolution (1978–1990)
Salvadoran Civil War (1979–1992)